The Airmotive EOS 001 is an American homebuilt aircraft that was designed and produced by Airmotive Engineers of Pontiac, Michigan. The aircraft was supplied as a kit for amateur construction, but is no longer available.

Design and development
The aircraft features a cantilever low-wing, a single-seat, enclosed open cockpit under a bubble canopy, retractable tricycle landing gear and a single engine in tractor configuration.

The aircraft is made from bonded and pop riveted aluminum sheet and has a  span wing. Optimized for simplicity of construction, the design has no compound curves and requires no jigs or special tools. The standard engine intended to be supplied with the kit was the  two-stroke Hirth 2702 powerplant with a reduction gearbox that allowed the propeller to operate at lower tip speeds. The prototype was equipped with a Volkswagen air-cooled engine.

In 1978 the claimed completion cost was US$2,000, not counting labor.

Operational history
The prototype EOS 001 was registered in the United States with the Federal Aviation Administration (FAA) in 1978.

By October 2013 two examples, including the prototype, had been at one time registered in the United States with the FAA, but both registrations were later canceled and it is likely that no examples of this type exist today.

Specifications (version)

References

External links
Photo of an EOS 001

EOS 001
1970s United States sport aircraft
Single-engined tractor aircraft
Low-wing aircraft
Homebuilt aircraft